Gas-s-s-s (on-screen title: Gas! -Or- It Became Necessary to Destroy the World in Order to Save It.) is a 1970 post-apocalyptic black comedy film produced and released by American International Pictures.

It was producer Roger Corman's final film for AIP, after a long association. He was unhappy because AIP made several cuts to the film without his approval, including the removal of the final shot in which God comments on the action — a shot Corman regarded as one of the greatest he had made in his life.

The movie is a post-apocalyptic dark comedy, about survivors of an accidental military gas leak involving an experimental agent that kills everyone on Earth over the age of 25 (a cartoon title sequence shows a John Wayne-esque Army General announcing — and denouncing — the "accident"; the story picks up as the last of the victims are dying with social commentary on Medicare and Medicaid). The subtitle alludes to the 1968 quote "it became necessary to destroy the town to save it" attributed to a U.S. Army officer after the Battle of Bến Tre in Vietnam.

The lead characters, Coel and Cilla, are played by Robert Corff and Elaine Giftos, and the cast features Ben Vereen, Cindy Williams, Bud Cort and Talia Shire (credited as "Tally Coppola") in early roles. Country Joe McDonald makes an appearance, as spokesman "AM Radio".

Plot
In Dallas, at Southern Methodist University, news comes in about a gas which has escaped from a military facility. It starts killing everyone over 25.

Hippie Coel meets and falls in love with Cilla. They discover a Gestapo-like police force will be running Dallas and flee into the country.

Their car is stolen by some cowboys. They then meet music fan Marissa, her boyfriend Carlos, Hooper and his girlfriend Coralee. Marissa leaves Carlos, who finds a new girlfriend.

The group meet Edgar Allan Poe, who throughout the film drives around on a motorbike with Lenore on the back and a raven on his shoulder, commenting on the action like a Greek chorus.

They then have an encounter with some golf-playing bikers, after which they attend a dance and concert where AM Radio is performing and passing on messages from God. Coel sleeps with Zoe, but Cilla is not jealous.

Coel, Cilla and their friends arrive at a peaceful commune where it seems mankind can start fresh. Then, a football team attacks them.

Eventually, God intervenes. Coel and Cilla are reunited with all their friends and there is a big party where everyone gets along.

Cast

Production

Development
George Armitage had met Roger Corman at 20th Century Fox when the latter was making The St Valentine's Day Massacre. Armitage later recalled he wrote a script — "it was called either Carrot Butts or A Christmas Carrot — which had animated cartoon characters, Bugs Bunny and so on, coming to life. It was about the studio systems and all this stuff." His agent gave the script to Gene [Corman, Roger's brother], who gave it to Roger, "and he loved it, so they submitted it to UA (United Artists) where they had a deal — Mike Medavoy was just taking over there and he was younger than I was. From there, Roger said: "Well, that didn't work, why don't we try something else?" Usually he has a title or something and he'll say: "Go ahead, write something, just keep the title.""

Gas-s-s-s was an idea of Corman's, about a world where everybody over 30 had died. Corman later said "my first thought was to do a science fiction film with allegorical overtones." Armitage remembers the concept just being "a sentence, and that's what we went with...He let you make it your own, and I did."

Corman said that although "there was some good work in" Armitage's first draft, "the points I was trying to make in the script either did not come through or came through too obviously different parts, and it became less science fiction and more and more a direct liberal left wing statement picture. I didn't want to be quite that obvious about what I was doing. So I then decided to switch to a comedy, thinking back to Bucket of Blood and Little Shop of Horrors."

United Artists had financed the script, but Corman says they felt it was too risky to finance, as they believed it needed a budget of 2 million dollars. Corman bought the script back off them and decided to finance the film himself, at around $300,000.

Shooting
Corman says filming commenced using a first draft, which was rewritten constantly throughout the shoot. "Winter was coming and I wanted to do the film", said Corman. "I was going to be shooting in New Mexico. I actually shot in December and to wait one more month would have put me in January and I could not have made the film. To wait till next summer would have dated the material I was dealing with, so I wanted to bring the film out early."

Armitage recalls, "We went back in '69 to shoot in New Mexico and Texas. I was the associate producer as well, and we were writing it as we went—which is something that Roger liked to do.

"It was a very inexpensive film", said Corman. "It was shot with a skeleton crew, with a cast of almost entirely amateur actors. Only the leads were professionals."

Shooting took around four weeks. Corman sold the movie to American International Pictures for the negative cost.

The film features a tribute to Edgar Allan Poe. Corman says "It was actually a second thought when we put Poe in it. We just started putting things in. In the original concept, he wasn't in it. And we just decided to put him in on a motorcycle—it seemed appropriate."

"There was some sense of disorganization and experimentation as we went along", says Corman. He says the film showed:
that I was beginning to get a little disillusioned with the youth culture of the time. I intended that the picture be sympathetic toward our lead gang of kids yet, at the same time, I wanted to show that I was beginning to suspect that all of the ideas being spouted by the counter-culture and all of the dreams were not totally rooted in reality. In the picture, I wanted to literally give youth the world they desired and, then, make a cautionary statement about how youth might not be able to handle it as perfectly as they anticipated.
Corman said there were themes in the film "which go back through all my previous pictures, such as the theme of the destruction of the world which I've played with to a certain extent, and there are some certain political and religious overtones I've dealt with before but I've never put them all together like this. The film became something I firmly believe in."

He added in 1971 that the film was

an attempt to look at certain aspects of the youth movement and an attempt to move to a better way of life. I end there with something I probably believe, which is that there is a struggle and that it is possible to overcome but not necessarily probable. It's not like some of the youth films that have come out in the last couple of years that have been an unquestioning acceptance of all the values of the youth culture. I've just been around too long to accept anything unquestioningly. This would be a kind of questioning acceptance of many of the values but not all of this culture. For that reason I'm not certain Gasss will be a success...Also the film is a little flawed in some areas.

Editing disagreements
Roger Corman was angry about what AIP did to the film. He later wrote:

Corman elaborated, saying:

[God was] played by an actor with an outrageous New York Jewish accent and they were really startled by that. But cutting God really took the heart out of the picture. I think it was partially the fact that AIP had become a public company and Sam was Jewish and they didn't want to be accused of being anti-Semitic.

Samuel Z. Arkoff of AIP recalled it differently:

Reception
Corman says the film opened at the Edinburgh Film Festival and he "got a cable from the organizers of the festival saying, "gasss explodes. Five minutes standing ovation." I thought, "Boy, I've really got one."

The film premiered in New York as part of a retrospective on Roger Corman's work.

In 1971, Corman stated:

AIP hates the picture. They dislike it intensely and they would not give it a New York opening. Since it's a very inexpensive picture, they've been playing it around the country in drive-ins and small towns where it's been doing only moderate business. The projection is that it will break even and possibly make a tiny profit. They don't want to spend the money to open in New York because it's very expensive to open right in New York. They feel it will not do well here and will turn a possibly slight loser into a slight failure. Because of the retrospective we have an essentially free opening here. However, I'm not quite as optimistic about the picture as I was after the news of the Edinburgh Festival. The fact that its been playing around to only moderate audiences may indicate some weaknesses in the film. On the other hand, it could mean that it's been playing to the wrong audiences.

According to Samuel Z. Arkoff, "when Gas-s-s-s was released, it was promoted with ads that proclaimed, 'Invite a few friends over to watch the end of the world.' The picture didn't make any money."

Corman later reflected:

One of the great problems is that the film is far too intellectual. Other people have told me that they think it's a meaningless film. They may well be both right. It is the most intricate and the most organized intellectual film that I have ever made. I was so careful to keep each concept deep behind a humorous look at it. I didn't want at any time to allow the preachings of what I was saying to come across too heavily and disturb the flow of the picture and its humor. In my desire to keep it in the background, I may have kept it so far in the background that I'm the only person who is going to know what is in every scene.

It was the last film Corman directed for AIP, and he only made one more movie before a 20-year sabbatical. "
A great deal of care went into what I was saying and how I was going to say it", he said of Gas-s-s-s. "The finished picture does not evidently make all these points. It discourages me and so for a little while I prefer to step away...Directing is very hard and very painful. Producing is easy. I can do it without really thinking about it." Corman did, however, go on to produce Boxcar Bertha for AIP.

Gas-s-s-s found a fresh audience on late night television in the 1980s. In 2005, it was issued on DVD as a Midnite Movies double feature with Wild in the Streets (1968), another AIP movie.

See also
 List of American films of 1970
 List of apocalyptic and post-apocalyptic fiction

References

External links
 
 
 Gas-s-s-s at Grindhouse Database

 Review of film  at The New York Times
 Review of film at The A.V. Club
 Review of film at  Variety

1970 films
1970s black comedy films
1970s science fiction comedy films
1970s comedy road movies
American black comedy films
American science fiction comedy films
American International Pictures films
American comedy road movies
American satirical films
1970s English-language films
Films directed by Roger Corman
Films produced by Roger Corman
Films set in Texas
Films shot in New Mexico
Films shot in Texas
Fiction about God
American post-apocalyptic films
1970 comedy films
1970 drama films
Cultural depictions of Edgar Allan Poe
1970s American films